London was a constituency of the European Parliament from 1999 until the UK exit from the European Union on 31 January 2020.

Between 2009 and 2020, it returned eight MEPs, using the D'Hondt method of party-list proportional representation.

Boundaries 
The constituency corresponded to the Greater London region of England, in the south east of the United Kingdom.

History 

Prior to 1999, London was represented by a number of single-member constituencies. These were London Central, London East, London North, London North East, London North West, London South East, London South Inner, London South West, London West, and parts of London South and Surrey East.

The European Parliamentary Elections Act 1999 reduced this to a single constituency returning a number of MEPs.

Returned members 
Below are all the members since the creation of the London constituency. The number of seats allocated to London had been reduced from 10 to 8 between 1999 and 2009 due to EU enlargement. Members elected in 1999 who previously represented a London constituency were Pauline Green (London North, elected 1989) and Robert Evans (London North West, elected 1994).

Returned Members by seat

Seats allocated using d'Hondt method, in order. Transfers within parties between elections omitted for simplicity.

Election results 
Elected candidates are shown in bold.  Brackets indicate the number of votes per seat won.

2019

2014

The 2014 results were delayed by Tower Hamlets, where there were recounts needed for six local election wards.

2009

2004

1999

References

Constituencies established in 1999
European Parliament constituencies in England (1999–2020)
Politics of London
1999 establishments in England
1999 in London
Constituencies disestablished in 2020